is a Japanese footballer currently playing as a right-back for Matsumoto Yamaga.

Career statistics

Club
.

Notes

References

External links

1998 births
Living people
Association football people from Tokyo
Hosei University alumni
Japanese footballers
Association football defenders
J2 League players
Matsumoto Yamaga FC players